David Lara is a retired American soccer player who played professionally in the USL A-League.

In 1998, Lara graduated from Benet Academy in Lisle, Illinois. He was 1997 Illinois All State in soccer. Lara attended Bradley University, playing eighty games from 1998 to 2001.  In 2002, he turned professional with the Milwaukee Rampage of the USL A-League. In 2000, Lara played for the Chicago Sockers as they won the USL Premier Development League title. Lara turned professional in 2002 with the Milwaukee Rampage of the USL A-League. The Rampage won the league championship that season, only to cease operations during the off-season.  In 2003, Lara signed with the Charleston Battery after a successful three week trial.  The Battery released him at the end of the season and Lara moved to the Syracuse Salty Dogs for the 2004 season.

References

Living people
1980 births
American soccer players
Bradley Braves men's soccer players
Charleston Battery players
Chicago Sockers players
Milwaukee Rampage players
Syracuse Salty Dogs players
A-League (1995–2004) players
USL League Two players
Association football defenders
Association football midfielders